Will or William Fyffe may refer to:

Will Fyffe (1885–1947), Scottish music hall and film actor-songwriter
William Samuel Fyffe (1914–1989), Northern Ireland unionist politician
William C. Fyffe (1929–2000), American TV news executive and consultant

See also
William Fyfe (disambiguation)
William Fife (disambiguation)